Plzeň (German and English: Pilsen, in German ) is a city in the Czech Republic.

The city is known worldwide for Pilsner beer, created by Bavarian brewer Josef Groll in the city in 1842.

Administrative division 
Plzeň is divided into ten boroughs, which are further divided into 25 administrative parts (in brackets):
Plzeň 1-Bolevec (Bolevec and Severní Předměstí)
Plzeň 2-Slovany (Božkov, Černice (partly), Doudlevce (partly), Hradiště, Koterov, Lobzy (partly) and Východní Předměstí (partly))
Plzeň 3-Bory (Doudlevce (partly), Jižní Předměstí, Litice (partly), Nová Hospoda, Radobyčice, Skvrňany, Valcha, Vnitřní Město and Východní Předměstí (partly))
Plzeň 4-Doubravka (Bukovec, Červený Hrádek, Doubravka, Lobzy (partly), Újezd and Východní Předměstí (partly))
Plzeň 5-Křimice
Plzeň 6-Litice (Litice (partly))
Plzeň 7-Radčice
Plzeň 8-Černice (Černice (partly))
Plzeň 9-Malesice (Dolní Vlkýš and Malesice)
Plzeň 10-Lhota

History

Middle Ages
Plzeň was first mentioned as a castle in 976, as the scene of a battle between Duke Boleslaus II the Pious of Bohemia and Emperor Otto II. It quickly became an important town on trade routes leading to Nuremberg and Regensburg; in the 14th century, it was the third-largest town in Bohemia after Prague and Kutná Hora.

During the Hussite Wars, it was the centre of Catholic resistance to the Hussites: Prokop the Great unsuccessfully besieged it three times, and it joined the league of Catholic nobles against King George of Poděbrady. In 1468, the town acquired a printing press; the Trojan Chronicle, the first book published in Bohemia, was printed on it.

17th century

Emperor Rudolf II made Plzeň his seat from 1599 to 1600. During the Thirty Years' War the town was taken by Mansfeld in 1618 after the Siege of Plzeň and it was not recaptured by Imperial troops until 1621. Wallenstein made it his winter quarters in 1633. Accused of treason and losing the support of his army, he fled the town on 23 February 1634 to Eger/Cheb where he was assassinated two days later. The town was increasingly threatened by the Swedes in the last years of the war. The city commander Jan van der Croon strengthened the fortifications of Plzeň from 1645 to 1649. Swedish troops passed the town in 1645 and 1648 without attacking it. The town and region have been staunchly Catholic despite the Hussite Wars.

From the end of the 17th century, the architecture of Plzeň has been influenced by the Baroque style. The city centre has been under cultural heritage preservation since 1989.

19th century
In the second half of the 19th century Plzeň, already an important trade centre for Bohemia, near the Bavarian/German border, began to industrialise rapidly. In 1869 Emil Škoda founded the Škoda Works, which became the most important and influential engineering company in the country and a crucial supplier of arms to the Austro-Hungarian Army. By 1917 the Škoda Works employed over 30,000 workers.

After 1898 the second largest employer was the National Railways train workshop, with about 2,000 employees: this was the largest rail repair shop in all Austria-Hungary. Between 1861 and 1877, the Plzeň railway junction was completed and in 1899 the first tram line started in the city. This burst of industry had two important effects: the growth of the local Czech population and of the urban poor. After 1868 first Czech mayor of the city was elected.

World War II
Following Czechoslovak independence from Austria-Hungary in 1918 the German-speaking minority in the countryside bordering the city of Plzeň hoped to be united with Austria and were unhappy at being included in Czechoslovakia. Many allied themselves to the Nazis after 1933 in the hope that Adolf Hitler might be able to unite them with their German-speaking neighbours.

Following the Munich Agreement in 1938, Plzeň became literally a frontier town; the creation of the Sudetenland moved Nazi Germany's borders to the city's outer limits. During the German occupation from 1939 to 1945, the Škoda Works in Pilsen was forced to provide armaments for the Wehrmacht, and Czech contributions, particularly in the field of tanks, were noted. The Germans operated a Gestapo prison in the city, and a forced labour camp in the Karlov district.

Between 17 and 26 January 1942, over 2,000 Jewish inhabitants, most of Plzeň's Jewish population, were deported by the Nazis to the Theresienstadt concentration camp.

The German-speaking population was expelled from the city after the end of the war in 1945, according to the provisions of the Potsdam Agreement. All of their property was confiscated.

On 6 May 1945, in the final days before the end of World War II in Europe, Plzeň was liberated from Nazi Germany by the 16th Armored Division of General George Patton's 3rd Army. Also participating in the liberation of the city were elements of the 97th and 2nd Infantry Divisions supported by the Polish Holy Cross Mountains Brigade. Other Third Army units liberated major portions of Western Bohemia. The rest of Czechoslovakia was liberated from German control by the Soviet Red Army. Elements of the 3rd Army, as well as units from the 1st Army, remained in Plzeň until late November 1945.

Communist era
After the 1948 Czechoslovak coup d'état, the government launched a currency reform in 1953, which caused a wave of discontent, including the Plzeň uprising. On 1 June 1953, over 20,000 people, mainly workers at the Škoda Works, began protesting against the government. Protesters forced their way into the town hall and threw communist symbols, furniture and other objects out of the windows. The protest caused a retaliation from the government. As part of its retaliation, they destroyed the statue of Tomáš Garrigue Masaryk. The statue has since been re-erected.

The next year, a West German homing pigeon was lost near the Czechoslovak border. It returned two days later, bearing a strong anticommunist message, signed "Unbowed Pilsen." The bird, named Leaping Lena, was taken to the United States, where it was celebrated as a Cold War hero.

Demographics

Geography and climate
Plzeň has a cool and temperate Oceanic climate (Cfb). Plzeň has low rainfall ( year average) evenly spread over the year. Precipitation occurs on average every second day, and the number of days with thunderstorms is 19. It receives on average 1,700 hours of sunshine though winters have longer periods without sunshine. Terrain features and a relatively low altitude give some shelter from strong winds.

Winters are chilly but milder than some adjacent areas. Snow cover is erratic and lasts on average for 51 days. Though an average year has 113 days with minimum temperature below zero, the temperature falls below  on 5 days. Winters are often murky with frequent long-standing haze. Spring is short, and in April to June there is blooming vegetation. Summer lasts from the end of May until the first third of September. During that period Plzeň has changeable weather which can be warm to hot. Days are up to 16 hours long.

Plzeň can be hot, especially during heat waves originating in the southern Mediterranean. The number of hot days above  is steadily growing, with 5 months (late April – early September) of possible 30+ °C days. If hot weather does occur, it is often changes after a few weeks into cold and rainy weather with incoming Atlantic-based fronts. Nights can be unpleasantly cold even in summer, with high level of humidity. Winter frosts frequently occur from the second half of November to the end of March. The only natural hazards are occasional fast changes of weather with negative consequences, e.g. floodings.

Extreme values for years 2011 and 2012: 
An extremely cold day of 2011 had  on average (23 February),  and extremely hot day  on average (24 August, .

Number of rainy/snowy days for 2011: 78; number of days with frost: 76; number of days with minimal temperatures below : 12; number of days with average temperature below zero: 35; number of days with daily average temperature higher than : 188; number of days with daily average higher than : 32. 
Total amount of precipitation for year 2011: ; average year humidity value: 80.8%. Maximal temperature: ; minimal temperature .
Average 2011 temperature: ; average speed of wind: , mainly from SSE.

Number of days with frost was 96 during year 2012; 18 days had minima below  and 165 days with an average temperature on or above . Number of days with maxima on or above  was 42.

Pilsner beer

Plzeň is an important city in the history of beer, including the development of Pilsner. In 1375 Bohemian king Charles IV endowed the Dobrow Monastery near Plzeň with the beer right, and it is one of the oldest breweries to survive to modern times. Many breweries were located in the interconnected deep cellars of the city.

The officials of Plzeň founded a city-owned brewery in 1839,  (Citizens' Brewery, now Plzeňský Prazdroj), and recruited Bavarian brewer Josef Groll (1813–1887) who produced the first batch of modern Pilsner beer on 5 October 1842. This included mastering the art of triple decoction mashing. The combination of pale colour from the new malts, Plzeň's remarkably soft water, Saaz noble hops from nearby Žatec (Saaz in German) and Bavarian-style lagering produced a clear, golden beer which was regarded as a sensation. Improving transport meant that this new beer was soon available throughout Central Europe and -style brewing was widely imitated.

In 1859, "Pilsner Bier" was registered as a brand name at the Chamber of Commerce and Trade in Plzeň. In 1898, the Pilsner Urquell trade mark was created to put emphasis on it being the original brewery.

Economy
Plzeň is a centre of business in the western part of the Czech Republic.

Since the late 1990s the city has experienced high growth in foreign investment. In 2007, Israeli mall developer Plaza Centers opened the Pilsen Plaza, a  shopping mall and entertainment centre featuring a multiplex cinema from Cinema City Czech Republic.

Plzeň produces about two-thirds of the Plzeň Region GDP, even though it contains only 29.8% of its population. Based on these figures, the city of Plzeň has a total GDP of approximately $7.2 billion, and a per capita GDP of $44,000. While part of this is explained by commuters to the city, it is one of the most prosperous cities in the Czech Republic.

The Škoda company, established in Plzeň in 1859, has been an important element of Austro-Hungarian, Czechoslovak and Czech engineering, and one of the biggest European arms factories. During the Communist era (1948–1989) the company's production had been directed to the needs of the Eastern Bloc. Disarray in the era after the Velvet Revolution, and unsuccessful efforts to gain new Western markets, resulted in sales problems and debts. After a huge restructuring process, the company was divided into several subsidiaries, which were later sold. The most important successors companies are Škoda Transportation and Doosan Škoda Power.

Many foreign companies now have manufacturing bases in Plzeň, including Daikin, Hisense and Panasonic. There has been much discussion of redeveloping those large areas of the Škoda plant which the company no longer uses.

Stock, located in the Božkov district, is the biggest distillery in the Czech Republic.

Religion

Since 31 May 1993 Plzeň has been the seat of the Roman Catholic Diocese of Plzeň. The first bishop (current bishop emeritus) was František Radkovský. The current bishop is Tomáš Holub. The diocese covers an area with a total of 818,700 inhabitants. The diocesan see is in St. Bartholomew's Cathedral on Republiky Square in Plzeň. The diocese is divided into 10 vicariates with a total of 72 parishes.

The seat of the West Bohemian seniorate (literary presbytery; Central European protestant equivalent of a diocese) of Evangelical Church of Czech Brethren is currently set in Plzeň. The current senior is Miroslav Hamari, the preacher of Koranda parish congregation of the Evangelical Church of Czech Brethren in Plzeň, commonly known as Koranda congregation located in the city centre of Plzeň. The senioral churchwarden is Josef Beneš, the parish churchwarden of the same congregation. There are two other parish congregations of Evangelical Church of Czech Brethren in the Plzeň-City District – The Western congregation of the Evangelical Church of Czech Brethren in Plzeň, known as The Western congregation located in the Western part of the city in the borough of Jižní předměstí and The Congregation of the Evangelical Church of Czech Brethren in Chrást located in Chrást in the very east of Plzeň-City District.

The seat of Plzeň diocese of the Czechoslovak Hussite Church is located in Plzeň (although the bishop has resided in Mirovice for several years due to a reconstruction of episcopacy). The current bishop is Filip Štojdl.

The Czech Evangelical Lutheran Church is headquartered in Plzeň. St. Paul's Lutheran Church is a church of the Czech Evangelical Lutheran Church in Plzeň.

The other churches also present in Plzeň are the Evangelical Church of the Augsburg Confession in the Czech Republic, the United Methodist Church, the Seventh-day Adventist Church, the Church of Brethren, the Orthodox Church of the Czech Lands and Slovakia, the Greek Catholic Church, and others.

Education
The University of West Bohemia in Plzeň is well known for its Faculty of Law, Faculty of Mechanical Engineering and Faculty of Applied Science in particular.

Martin Luther Elementary School (Základní škola Martina Luthera) is a private Christian school of the Czech Evangelical Lutheran Church in Plzeň.

Sport

The ice hockey club HC Škoda Plzeň plays in the Czech Extraliga. The team plays its home games at Home Monitoring Aréna.
The football club FC Viktoria Plzeň plays in the Czech First League and belongs among the most successful clubs in the Czech Republic. Viktoria Plzeň has played in the UEFA Champions League and UEFA Europa League. The team plays its home games at Doosan Arena.
Handball club Talent Plzeň plays in the Czech Handball Extraliga.

Tourism

There is also a  historic tunnel and cellar network, among the longest in Central Europe.

Built in 1532, the former water tower was integrated into the city's fortification system at Prague Gate. Another storey was added in 1822 in French Imperial style. The Gothic portal dating from the 1500s and coming from another house, which had been demolished, was added in 1912. Above the portal there is a commemorative plaque dedicated to Dr Josef Škoda (a professor at the Vienna University), who was born next door on 10 December 1805.

Plzeň is also well known for the Pilsner Urquell (since 1842) and Gambrinus (since 1869) breweries, currently owned by Asahi Group Holdings. A popular tourist attraction is the Plzeňský Prazdroj brewery tour where visitors can discover the history of beer. The pilsener style of beer was developed in Plzeň in the 19th century.

Plzeň was a European Capital Of Culture in 2015, along with Mons in Belgium.

Museums
 Franciscan Monastery – Museum of Christian Art
 Západočeské muzeum v Plzni

Transport

Trams, trolleybuses and buses 

The Plzeň metropolitan area is largely served by a network of trams, trolleybuses and buses operated by the PMDP. Like other continental European cities, tickets bought from vending machines or small shops are valid for any transport run by the city of Plzeň. For residents of the city, a Plzeň Card can be purchased and through a system of "topping up" be used on any public transport with no limitations, as long as it is paid up and valid. Tickets can be purchased in vehicles with a contactless smart card.

Rail
Plzeň is an important centre of Czech railway transport, with the crossing of five main railway lines:
 line Nr. 170: Prague – Beroun – Plzeň – Cheb
 line Nr. 180: Plzeň – Domažlice – Furth im Wald (Germany)
 line Nr. 183: Plzeň – Klatovy – Železná Ruda
 line Nr. 160: Plzeň – Žatec
 line Nr. 190: Plzeň – České Budějovice

Plzeň main railway station (Plzeň hlavní nádraží) serves all five of these lines.

Road
The most important transport link in the city is the D5 highway connecting Prague and Nuremberg.

Air
A public domestic and private international airport is located 11 km south-west from Plzeň, at the nearby village of Líně.

Notable people

Emil Škoda (1839–1900), engineer and industrialist
Josef Finger (1841–1925), physicist and mathematician
Emma B. Mandl (1842–1928), Chicago charities founder
Friedrich Goldscheider (1845–1897), ceramist and industrialist
František Křižík (1847–1941), inventor
Augustin Němejc (1861–1938), painter
Rudolf Karel (1880–1945), composer
Emil Lederer (1882–1939), economist and sociologist
Růžena Šlemrová (1886–1962), actress
Josef Beran (1888–1969), cardinal, Czech primate, archbishop of Prague 
Josef Skupa (1892–1957), puppeteer
Jaroslav Vogel (1894–1970), conductor, composer
Ladislav Sutnar (1897–1976), graphic designer, pioneer of information design and information architecture
Jaroslav Černý (1898–1970), Oxford professor and Egyptologist
Siegfried Lederer (1904–1972), Auschwitz escapee
Jiří Trnka (1912–1969), artist
Miroslav Štandera (1918–2014), fighter pilot for the Royal Air Force during World War II
Ota Šik (1919–2004), economist
Karel Černý (1922–2014), art director
Miroslav Holub (1923–1998), poet
Josef Rösch (1925–2016), interventional radiologist
Kurt Dietmar Richter (1931−2019), German composer, conductor 
Karla Erbová (born 1933), poet, prose writer, and journalist
Gabriela Basařová (1934–2019), professor of chemistry, researched fermentation chemistry, brewing, and malting
Peter Grünberg (1939–2018), German physicist, 2007 Nobel prize winner
Karel Gott (1939–2019), singer
Jaroslav Beneš (born 1946), fine art photographer
Tomáš Šmíd (born 1956), tennis player
Vítězslav Lavička (born 1963), football manager
Tomáš Cihlář (born 1967), chemist and virologist
David Kotyza (born 1967), tennis coach
Martin Straka (born 1972), ice hockey player
Luboš Motl (born 1973), physicist
Jiří Mužík (born 1976), track and field athlete
Petr Sýkora (born 1976), ice hockey player
Milan Kraft (born 1980), ice hockey player
Petr Čech (born 1982), football player
Kateřina Emmons (born 1983), sport shooter, Olympic medalist
Andrea Hlaváčková (born 1986), tennis player
Barbora Strýcová (born 1986), tennis player
Andrej Šustr (born 1990), ice hockey player
Pavel Francouz (born 1990), ice hockey player
Dominik Kubalík (born 1995), ice hockey player

Twin towns – sister cities

Plzeň is twinned with:

 Birmingham, United States
 Liège, Belgium
 Limoges, France
 Regensburg, Germany
 Takasaki, Japan
 Winterthur, Switzerland
 Žilina, Slovakia

Gallery

References

External links

Tourist Information Server
Official website of the candidature of Pilsen candidature 2015 Cultural Capital of Europe
Description of Plzeň
PMDP – Public Transport of Plzeň
Plzeň at the official website of the Czech Republic
Description of Plzeň
University of West Bohemia
Pilsner Pubs – restaurant and gastronomy guide to the city
A-Plzen.com – Tourist Information
Plzenska.com – articles about Plzeň
WebCams from Plzeň

 
Cities and towns in the Czech Republic
Populated places in Plzeň-City District